April Rose  is an American politician. She is a Republican who represents the fifth district, based in Carroll County, Maryland, in the Maryland House of Delegates and has served as the Assistant Minority Leader since 2021.

In the legislature
Rose was appointed by Governor Larry Hogan to fill a vacancy left by former Del. Justin Ready, who was appointed to fill a vacancy in the Maryland Senate left by former Sen. Joseph Getty. She was sworn in on March 16, 2015.

Rose was re-elected for a second term with 26.8% of the vote in 2018.

Electoral history

References

Republican Party members of the Maryland House of Delegates
Living people
21st-century American politicians
21st-century American women politicians
People from Salisbury, Maryland
1968 births